Zhao Yingyun (born June 1963) is a former Chinese politician who spent his entire career in his home-province Hunan. He was investigated by China's top anti-graft agency in July 2022.

He was a delegate to the 13th National People's Congress.

Biography
Zhao was born in Shaodong County (now Shaodong), Hunan, in June 1963. He received his master's degree in law from Central China Normal University in 1993 and doctor's degree in philosophy from Hunan Normal University in 2003, respectively.

Zhao joined the Chinese Communist Party (CCP) in March 1994, and got involved in politics in January 1997, when he was transferred to the Publicity Department of the CCP Hunan Provincial Committee. He was appointed party secretary of Zhongfang County in November 2008 and was admitted to member of the Standing Committee of the CCP Huaihua Municipal Committee, the city's top authority. In September 2011, he became a member of the Standing Committee of the CCP Changde Municipal Committee, in addition to serving as secretary of Discipline Inspection Commission. In May 2013, he was named acting vice mayor of Changde, confirmed in the following month. In June 2014, he was transferred back to Huaihua and appointed deputy party secretary. He was made acting mayor in July 2014, and was installed in December of that same year. In December 2017, he was chosen as deputy party secretary and acting mayor of Yongzhou, confirmed in January 2018.

Investigation
On 27 July 2022, he has been placed under investigation for "serious violations of laws and regulations" by the Central Commission for Discipline Inspection (CCDI), the party's internal disciplinary body, and the National Supervisory Commission, the highest anti-corruption agency of China.

References

1963 births
Living people
People from Shaodong
Central China Normal University alumni
Hunan Normal University alumni
People's Republic of China politicians from Hunan
Chinese Communist Party politicians from Hunan
Mayors of Huaihua
Mayors of Yongzhou
Delegates to the 13th National People's Congress